The 2004 Vuelta a Murcia was the 20th professional edition of the Vuelta a Murcia cycle race and was held on 3 March to 7 March 2004. The race started and finished in Murcia. The race was won by Alejandro Valverde.

General classification

References

2004
2004 in road cycling
2004 in Spanish sport